Reza Bagher (born 10 March 1958) is an Iranian-born Swedish film director and screenwriter. He is best known for his film Popular Music, based on the novel Popular Music from Vittula by Mikael Niemi.

Filmography

References

External links
 

1958 births
Living people
People from Tehran
Swedish film directors
Swedish people of Iranian descent
Iranian film directors